Tunisian vehicle registration plate allows the identification of vehicles registered in Tunisia.

Format

It takes the form XXX تونس XXXX where X is a number between 0 and 9, and تونس means "Tunisia" in  Arabic script. Writing in white on a black background. The first three digits designate the series and the last four digits denote the number of vehicle registration in the series. The serial and registration number are separated by the name of Tunisia in Arabic.

The passage of a series to the next is for each record in 9999 vehicles.

Rental cars maintain the same format as shown above except that the plates have white numbers on a blue background.

The registration format shown above is awarded to any vehicle type with the exception of the following special plates.

 Government departments and offices of state: in the form XX - XXXXX, writing in red on a white background. The left XX are numbers designating a ministry.
For example, 03 is the Ministry of Justice, 15 is the Ministry of Transport.
The right XXXXX numbers designate the registration of the Ministry-owned vehicle.

 From the military: in the form of an acronym of the army XXXXX, writing in white on black background with a small Tunisian flag on the left of the plate.
 Diplomatic Missions: in the form of "XX CD س د XX" (CD stands for Corps Diplomatique) or "XX MD ب د XX" (MD stands for Mission Diplomatique), writing in black on a white background.
Ambassadors cars  have the "CMD" inscription (Chef de Mission Diplomatique), in the form "XX CMD ر ب د XX" with 01 on the right side of the plate.

 Vehicles to temporary registration: RS in the form XXXXX ن ت, writing in white on black background.
 Vehicles being tested by dealers of vehicles in the form of XXXXX ع ع, writing in black on a yellow background.

Dimensions

Motorcycles 
Only a back registration plate is mandatory. It must be 170 mm long and 120 mm wide.

Other vehicles 
Two registration plates are mandatory. Front plate must be 450 mm long and 100 mm wide. Back plate must be 520 mm long and 110 mm wide, or 275 mm long and 200 mm wide in case it has two lines.
On most vehicles, front plates are larger than what is required, having the legal dimensions of the back plate, which is tolerated by the police.

Series dates 

Each series of vehicle registration refers to a year and hence its age. However, there is no rule and this depends on how many vehicles have been registered in a specific year. 
For example, series can last more than a whole year if less than 9999 vehicles are registered. But since in Tunisia an average of 50,000 new vehicles are registered each year, five series of number plates are issued. Late 140 series or early 141 series are expected by the end of 2009.

 2008: 136, 135, 134, 133, 132 and 131.
 2009: 140, 139, 138, 137, 136

References

External links

 Tunisia on worldlicenseplates.com 

Tunisia
Transport in Tunisia
Tunisia transport-related lists